David Axelrod (1935 – 1994) was a New York physician and bureaucrat.

Career 
After obtaining his medical degree from Harvard in 1960, he served a two-year residency in Rochester. He then worked for the National Institutes of Health in Bethesda, Maryland as a virus research scientist until joining the New York State Department of Health in 1968.

He was Health Commissioner for the State of New York in the 1980s and 1990s. He was appointed by Governor Hugh Carey and served under Governor Mario Cuomo as well. He is considered to be the nation's foremost public health official of the 1980s.

He worked on issues of regulating doctors and hospitals, the confidentiality of AIDS patients,  anti-smoking legislation and universal health insurance.

In the 1980s, Axelrod collaborated with the President of the University at Albany, SUNY to establish the School of Public Health. The university named a fellowship after him.

Death 
His career ended after suffering a stroke in February 1991 and he died three years later.

References 

1935 births
1994 deaths
American health officials
20th-century American physicians
American public health doctors
Harvard Medical School alumni
Commissioners of Health of the State of New York
Members of the National Academy of Medicine